Alos is a commune in the Ariège department in the Occitanie region of southwestern France.

The inhabitants of the commune are known as Alosiens or Alosiennes

Geography
Alos is located some 100 km south by south-west of Toulouse, about 40 km west of Foix, and about 10 km north of the Spanish border.  It is a high mountain commune with only three tortuous access roads: the D37 branching west from the D3 south of Lacourt enters the commune in the northeast and continues to the village before continuing south-east to join the D17 road north of Seix. There is also the D137 road coming south-west from Moulis which enters the commune in the north and joins the D37 near the village. Apart from Alos there are the hamlets of Artiguenard and La Riviere in the commune. There are numerous small country roads throughout much of the commune which consists mainly of mountain slopes and forests.

The Riviere d'Alois flows out of the north-east to join the Salat river to the east. Numerous streams feed into the Alois including the Raven de Guerbrens which forms part of the eastern border and the Ruisseau de Argeniere which flows from the south of the commune. Many other streams flow into the Alois from all corners of the commune.

Neighbouring communes and villages

Administration

List of Successive Mayors of Alos

Population

See also 
 Communes of the Ariège department

References

External links
Alos on the old National Geographic Institute website 
Alos on Géoportail, National Geographic Institute (IGN) website 
Alos on the 1750 Cassini Map

Communes of Ariège (department)